Ana María Fernández Militino is a Spanish spatial statistician. She is a professor of statistics and operations research at the Public University of Navarre. Despite the usual conventions for Spanish surnames, her English-language publications list her name as "Ana F. Militino".

Education and career
Militino studied mathematics at the University of Zaragoza from 1976 to 1981, and completed a doctorate in statistics in 1984 at the University of Extremadura. After several years of work as a public administrator, she became a professor at the Public University of Navarre in 1990.

Books
Militino is the coauthor, with Alan T. Arnholt and María Dolores Ugarte, of the book Probability and Statistics with R (Chapman & Hall / CRC, 2008), and is the author of several other statistics textbooks.

Recognition
In 2010 the International Association for Mathematical Geosciences gave Militino their John Cedric Griffiths Teaching Award.

References

External links
Home page

Year of birth missing (living people)
Living people
Spanish statisticians
Women statisticians
Geostatistics
University of Zaragoza alumni
University of Extremadura alumni
Academic staff of the Public University of Navarre